Denny-Blaine Park is a  park in the Denny-Blaine neighborhood of Seattle, Washington. It is located on Lake Washington along and at the end of E. Denny-Blaine Place.

The land for the park was donated to the City of Seattle by Charles L. Denny and Elbert F. Blaine, who were also responsible for sub-dividing the surrounding neighborhood. There is a grass beach as well as a picnic area and a volleyball pit.

Much of a renovation completed in 2004 involved the large middle bed just above the shoreline.

It is said the actor John Wayne rented the house to the South, and, due to people peeping over the wall, a hedge was put in running along the South border of the park, above the lower beach levels.

Parks close by include Lake Washington Boulevard (borders on the West), Viretta Park (to the SW), Howell Park (few blocks South) and Lakeview Park (to the NW).

Topfree and clothing optional use
Denny-Blaine Park is a nudist park so nudity is very common. Regular nudists maintain the beach to a degree.

In the past the beach had a much higher use of nudity and topfree use and was also known as Dykiki (a playful combination of the words Dyke and Waikiki) because the area had a reputation for a large number of lesbians who would go topfree or nude on the beach.

World Naked Bike Ride (WNBR) Seattle had its bodypainting party here on 17 Aug 2008, and returned on Aug 16, 2009 with Hemp Ride 2009 (affiliated with WNBR Seattle).

Several Seattle Parks & Recreation workers report nudity used to be more common as well as topfree use.

References

External links

Parks in Seattle